Frit Forum - Social Democratic Students of Denmark (or just Frit Forum) is the student organization of the Danish Social Democrats.

It was established in 1943 during the Nazi occupation of Denmark as a means of reaching out to the growing number of students in the labour movement. Since then, it has had a decisive impact on Danish politics, fostering many leaders and influential Social Democrats.

Former PES-president Poul Nyrup Rasmussen, former Danish frontrunner to the European Parliament Dan Jørgensen, and former Minister of Finance Mogens Lykketoft began their paths in Frit Forum. It compares to the Labour Students in the UK.

After peaking in the 1950s and 1960s, it was struck by the radicalization of the political left among Danish students.

In 2003, this caused a conflict within the organization, as the DSU felt Frit Forum was not fulfilling its obligations at the universities. Instead, they threatened to launch a new social democratic Student network, called SSN. Following devastating internal disputes, it was saved by the president of the Danish Social Democrats, Mogens Lykketoft, himself being former president of Frit Forum.

Since then, the climate between the two organizations has bettered. Over the years, Frit Forum has held meetings and conferences with both the Labour Students (England) and S-studenter (Sweden).

See also
 Politics of Denmark
 List of political parties in Denmark
 Social Democratic Youth of Denmark

External links

Sources (in English):
  Official homepage of Frit Forum in English.
  Background information on Poul Nyrup.
  PES information about Frit Forum.

Sources (in Danish):
  Official homepage of Frit Forum in Danish
  Article on Mogens Lykketoft in Information.
  Background information on Danish Social Democratic leaders.

Political parties established in 1943
Political parties in Denmark
Social Democrats (Denmark)
Student political organizations
Youth wings of social democratic parties
Youth wings of political parties in Denmark
1943 establishments in Denmark